Huaxiang Subdistrict, or previously Huaxiang Area, is a subdistrict on the eastern side of Fengtai District, Beijing, China. In 2020 it had a population of 119,171

The name of the subdistrict, Huaxiang, was derived from its historical status as a major producer of flowers, especially jasmine and lilytree, since 1900s,

History

Administrative Division 
In 2021, Huaxiang Subdistrict is divided into 11 subdivisions, with 6 communities and 5 villages:

Landmark 

 Beijing World Park

See also 

 List of township-level divisions of Beijing

References 

Fengtai District
Subdistricts of Beijing